Neocomites is a genus of ammonite from the Lower Cretaceous, Berriasian to Hauterivian, and type genus for the Neocomitidae.

Description 
The shell of Neocomites is fairly involute and compressed with flattish  sides; covered with flexeous ribs that branch in small sheaves from faint umbilical tubercles, in some branching again or intercaled further out on the whorls, ending in small oblique bullae in either side of a smooth flat venter. Ribs may cross the venter transversely  on later whorls. Sutures have deep 1st lateral lobes.

Distribution 
Neocomites has a fairly widespread distribution and has been found in such places as central and southern Europe, North Africa, Madagascar, northern India, Borneo, Sumatra, Texas, Mexico, Colombia (Macanal Formation, Eastern Ranges), Peru, and Argentina.

References

Bibliography 
 W.J. Arkell, et al., 1957. Mesozoic Ammonoidea, Treatise on Invertebrate Paleontology Part L, Ammonoidea.

External links 

Ammonitida genera
Perisphinctoidea
Cretaceous ammonites
Ammonites of Africa
Ammonites of Asia
Ammonites of Europe
Ammonites of North America
Cretaceous Mexico
Fossils of Mexico
Ammonites of South America
Cretaceous Argentina
Fossils of Argentina
Cretaceous Colombia
Fossils of Colombia
Cretaceous Peru
Fossils of Peru
Fossil taxa described in 1905